The 1981–82 Alpha Ethniki was the 46th season of the highest football league of Greece. The season began on 6 September 1981 and ended on 30 May 1982. Olympiacos won their third consecutive and 23rd Greek title.

The point system was: Win: 2 points - Draw: 1 point.

League table

Results

Championship play–off

Top scorers

External links
Greek Wikipedia
Official Greek FA Site
Greek SuperLeague official Site
SuperLeague Statistics

Alpha Ethniki seasons
Greece
Alpha Ethniki